TDCAA may refer to:

 Texas District and County Attorneys Association, a non-profit based in Austin, Texas
 Toronto District College Athletic Association, a member of the Ontario Federation of School Athletic Associations